Abdul Latiff Abdul Majeed (15 November 1933 – 13 November 1987) was a Sri Lankan politician and Member of Parliament.

Early life
Abdul Majeed was born on 15 November 1933. He was educated at Sivananda Vidyalayam, Batticaloa and Trincomalee Hindu College. He later studied at Wadia College, Bombay and Presidency College, Madras.

Abdul Majeed's son Mohamed Najeeb is a provincial councillor and Member of Parliament.

Political career
Abdul Majeed stood as a candidate in Mutur at the March 1960 parliamentary election but failed to get elected. He stood as the Sri Lanka Freedom Party (SLFP) candidate in Mutur at the July 1960 parliamentary election. He won the election and entered Parliament. He was appointed Parliamentary Secretary to the Minister of Public Works  in 1964.

Abdul Majeed was re-elected at the 1965 and 1970 parliamentary elections. He served as Deputy Minister of Information and Broadcasting from 1970 to 1977.

The 1976 Delimitation Commission created Seruvila Electoral District from parts of Mutur Electoral District. Mutur was demoted from a two-member district to a single-member district. Abdul Majeed lost his seat at the 1977 parliamentary election.

Abdul Majeed was assassinated on 13 November 1987. The militant Liberation Tigers of Tamil Eelam was widely blamed for the assassination.

References

1933 births
1987 deaths
Alumni of R. K. M. Sri Koneswara Hindu College
Assassinated Sri Lankan politicians
Deputy ministers of Sri Lanka
Members of the 5th Parliament of Ceylon
Members of the 6th Parliament of Ceylon
Members of the 7th Parliament of Ceylon
Parliamentary secretaries of Ceylon
People from Eastern Province, Sri Lanka
People killed during the Sri Lankan Civil War
People from British Ceylon
Presidency College, Chennai alumni
Sri Lanka Freedom Party politicians
Sri Lankan Moor politicians
Sri Lankan Muslims